Tommy Downs (22 May 1901 – 11 August 1981) was an Australian rules footballer who played for Carlton in the Victorian Football League (VFL).

Downs was a Woodham Cup winner at Northcote in 1925, having previously played with Preston.

One of shortest ever footballers at Carlton, Downs had a poor record at the VFL tribunal. He was suspended for 12 games in 1928 and 19 games the following season, both for striking. The former came in a Semi Final loss to Richmond when he kicked a career best four goals and the latter was in a Preliminary Final. Most famously however he received a 29-game suspension in 1931 when he was reported for kicking Richmond's captain Maurie Hunter. In a postscript to this incident, in 1954 teammate Frank O'Rourke admitted in a newspaper interview that he kicked Hunter.

References

Holmesby, Russell and Main, Jim (2007). The Encyclopedia of AFL Footballers. 7th ed. Melbourne: Bas Publishing.

1901 births
Carlton Football Club players
Northcote Football Club players
Preston Football Club (VFA) players
Australian rules footballers from Melbourne
1981 deaths
People from Fitzroy, Victoria